State Route 70 (SR 70) is a state-maintained highway in East Tennessee, beginning at the border with North Carolina in the midst of the Cherokee National Forest and the Great Smoky Mountains and ending at the Virginia border in the extremely rural and mountainous terrain of Hancock County.

The highway travels through both Greeneville and Rogersville, bisecting Interstate 81 between the two towns.

Route description

Greene County

SR 70 begins in Greene County as a primary highway at the North Carolina border, with the highway continuing as North Carolina Highway 208. It begins as a curvy 2-lane highway, going through the mountains along the Tennessee - North Carolina border. It goes west, crossing the Appalachian Trail a few hundred feet across the border before going through some mountains before lowering down into the farmland of Greene County and turning north, straightening and widening into a 2-lane rural highway with a speed limit of 55 (mph). SR 70 then enters the community of South Greene and coming to a Y-intersection with SR 107, becoming concurrent with that route. They then come to an intersection with SR 351 (which is also Tennessee State Route 107 Cutoff, an auxiliary Route of SR 107) before leaving South Greene at a crossing of the Nolichucky River, just a few yards away from the historic Nolichucky Dam and its reservoir, Davy Crockett Lake. SR 70/SR 107 continue north through some farmland before entering Greeneville. They go through some suburbs and pass by a few businesses before coming to an intersection with US 321/SR 35, with the SR 107 separating to follow that route northeast into downtown, all the while SR 70 completely bypasses downtown to the south. SR 70 then widens to 4-lanes, through undivided, and goes to intersect and become concurrent with US 11E Bus/SR 350, turning west. They then come to major interchange with US 11E/SR 34 (Andrew Johnson Highway), where US 11E Bus/SR 350 both end and SR 70 becomes concurrent with US 11E/SR 34, turning east as a 4-lane divided highway, with the road continuing as Blue Springs Parkway (Old US 11E). Shortly afterwards, they come to another intersection, where SR 70 separates and turns north, returning to a 2-lane highway and leaving Greeneville. It then becomes narrow and curvy again as it goes through more farmland. It then makes a sharp right turn at an intersection with a county road (Marvin Road) before continuing north for about 2 miles before coming to an interchange with I-81 (Exit 30). It then come to a T-intersection with Horton Highway, a major county road the connects the highway to the town of Baileyton, the community of Fall Branch, and SR 93. It then turns left to go west around a mountain before going down a narrow valley before weaving through some mountains and crossing into Hawkins County.

Hawkins County

SR 70 then weaves through some more mountains before finally turning west to enter farmland again and widen and straighten into a 2-lane rural highway with a speed limit of 55 (mph). It then intersects with Old Highway 70, the narrow and curvy former alignment of SR 70 through the area before it was realigned onto a new highway. It then continues west before entering and going through the town of Persia before coming to an intersection and becoming concurrent with SR 66, just north of that route's intersection with SR 113. They then go north and catch-up with the other end of Old Highway 70 before crossing a bridge over the Holston River/Cherokee Lake. They then enter Rogersville and pass through a business district and some neighborhoods before coming to an interchange with Main Street (Old US 11W), which connects the highway to downtown to the northeast as SR 66/SR 70 bypass it to the southwest. They then come to an interchange with US 11W/SR 1 (Lee Highway/Memphis to Bristol Highway), where SR 70 separates to become concurrent with US 11W/SR 1 to the northeast while SR 66 continues north as curvy and narrow secondary highway towards Sneedville. They then pass along the northern edge of downtown, as a 4-lane divided highway, before coming to an interchange with SR 347 (Main Street/Old US 11W), where SR 347 ends and SR 70 separates to take over that route and it goes north as a narrow and curvy 2-lane highway through both mountains and farmland before coming to an intersection with SR 94 (Pressmen's Home Road), which runs through the abandoned town of Pressmen's Home, before entering a long mountain pass over several mountains and ridges before crossing into Hancock County just north of the community of Edison.

Hancock County

SR 70 then winds its way along the banks of the Clinch River before crossing it along the historic Kyles Ford Bridge and entering Kyles Ford. It then immediately has an intersection and concurrency with SR 33 as they go through the heart of the community before separating with SR 33 turning southwest towards Sneedville while SR 70 continues north, becoming a secondary highway and going through some countryside before crossing the Virginia state line and continuing as Virginia State Route 70 (Trail of the Lonesome Pine) towards Jonesville, VA.

History

Throughout the highway's duration, and its companion route across the state line in Virginia, SR 70 is known and signed as Trail of the Lonesome Pine, with markers placed along the entire route, though they have not been maintained in many years and are now few and far between. This was done to commemorate the history of the highway as it was originally built as the Trail of the Lonesome Pine auto trail, an auto trail from Detroit to Florida. In 1924, a group of citizens from far western Virginia appeared before the Virginia State Highway Commission, asking them to take it over as a state highway. A member of the Tennessee Legislature stated that be was sure that it would be designated a state highway in Tennessee if Virginia took over their part, which happened in a period between 1924-1928.

Junction list

See also
List of Tennessee state highways

References

070
Transportation in Hawkins County, Tennessee
Rogersville, Tennessee
Transportation in Greene County, Tennessee
Transportation in Hancock County, Tennessee